Bolshoye Osanovo is a rural locality (a village) in Nikolotorzhskoye Rural Settlement, Kirillovsky District, Vologda Oblast, Russia. The population was 13 as of 2002.

Geography 
Bolshoye Osanovo is located 32 km northeast of Kirillov (the district's administrative centre) by road. Sopigino is the nearest rural locality.

References 

Rural localities in Kirillovsky District